Philippe Robert Paoli (born 3 January 1995) is a Lebanese former professional footballer who played as a forward. 

After playing one season with Racing Beirut, Paoli moved to Lyon B in 2013. He then moved to Germany the following year, where he played for 1. FC Köln II. In 2014 he moved to Belgium, playing for Lommel, before moving to Oosterwijk on loan in 2016, where he ended his professional career aged 22. Paoli also represented the Lebanese national team.

Club career
Paoli is a graduate of the Dbayeh-based Athletico SC academy. He also practiced athletics, a discipline that saw him win several national titles in the youth categories. Having played for Racing Beirut in the Lebanese Premier League, Paoli joined the Olympique Lyon B team in summer 2013 on a two-year deal. He played for Köln II in 2014.

In summer 2015, Paoli moved to Belgian First Division B side Lommel United. He was sidelined for most of the season due to a fibula fracture. In 2016, Paoli joined Oosterwijk on a one-year loan. In 2017, Paoli was nominated among the 17 candidates for the Belgian Lion, an award given to the best player of Arab origin in the Belgian First Division A.

International career
Aged 17, Paoli was called by coach Theo Bücker for the Lebanon national team for a friendly match against the Australia on 6 September 2012, in which he came on as a substitute in the 59th minute. He was the captain of the Lebanon national under-19 team during the 2016 AFC U-19 Championship qualifiers that took place in Oman in 2015.

Style of play 
Initially a winger in his youth, Paoli developed into a striker once he moved to Europe.

Personal life
Paoli has dual Lebanese–Greek nationality. Paoli's sister, Andrea, participated in the 2012 Olympics as a Taekwondo practitioner; his father, Robert, was a basketball player.

In 2017, after retiring from professional football aged 22, Paoli studied at King's College London to pursue a degree in business and management.

Honours
Individual
 Lebanese Premier League Best Young Player: 2012–13

References

External links
 
 
 
 
 

1995 births
Living people
Footballers from Beirut
Lebanese people of Greek descent
Lebanese footballers
Association football forwards
Al Egtmaaey SC players
Racing Club Beirut players
1. FC Köln II players
Lommel S.K. players
Lierse Kempenzonen players
Lebanese Premier League players
Regionalliga players
Challenger Pro League players
Belgian Third Division players
Lebanon youth international footballers
Lebanon international footballers
Lebanese expatriate footballers
Expatriate footballers in France
Expatriate footballers in Germany
Expatriate footballers in Belgium
Lebanese expatriate sportspeople in France
Lebanese expatriate sportspeople in Germany
Lebanese expatriate sportspeople in Belgium